JS-1, JS1, or variant, may refer to:

 JS-1 heavy tank, Josef Stalin 1 Soviet WWII tank
 Ligier JS1, 1969-1970 sportscar from Ligier
 ECMAscript 1.0 (JS1.0), JavaScript standard, see JavaScript
 JScript 1.0 (MS JS 1.0), Microsft Javascript variant, see JScript
 Oldsmobile Jetstar I (JS1) 1960s sedan
 Jonker JS-1 Revelation, sailplane
 JS1 (phylum), a candidatus phylum of bacteria now called afribacteria

See also
 WinJS 1.0, Windows Library for JavaScript
 JSI (disambiguation)
 JS (disambiguation)